During the 1993–94 English football season, Millwall F.C. competed in the Football League First Division.

Season summary
The 1993–94 season was their first at the new ground, also known as The Den, which was opened by the Labour Party leader John Smith MP on 4 August 1993. In McCarthy's second full season in charge, he took the club to the play-offs after a strong 3rd-place finish, but they lost out to Derby County in the semi finals.

Final league table

Results
Millwall's score comes first

Legend

Football League First Division

First Division play-offs

FA Cup

League Cup

Anglo-Italian Cup

Squad

References

Millwall F.C. seasons
Millwall